Ręce do góry (known in its subtitled English version as Hands Up!) is a Polish drama film directed by Jerzy Skolimowski. It is the fourth of a series of semi-autobiographical films in which Skolimowski himself plays his alter ego Andrzej Leszczyc. At the time it was banned in Poland, under the Communist regime, for 18 years because it depicted the Stalinist past.

The film was originally made in 1967 in monochrome by :pl:Zespół Filmowy Syrena studio. In a 20-minute section (filmed in colour) added by Skolimowski in 1981 he explains how the original was withheld by Polish censors of the time and that this was a principal cause of his leaving his country; however following liberalisation in Poland, he was invited to resuscitate it. The introduction includes, apart from some fictional apocalyptic passages, shots of Beirut ruined by the civil wars of the 1970s, where Skolimowski is working as an actor on Volker Schlöndorff's German film Die Fälschung (Circle of Deceit), and also shots of London featuring demonstrations in favour of Solidarność, Speaker's Corner, and an exhibition of Skolimowski's own paintings. These sections include cameo roles by Bruno Ganz, David Essex, Mike Sarne and others. Some of the music in this introduction is from the 1970 choral work Kosmogonia by the Polish composer Krzysztof Penderecki.

The original film is a surrealistic reunion of Leszczyc (who has apparently become a veterinary surgeon) and some of his student colleagues. They refer to themselves by the makes of the cars they own - Leszczyc owns a Zastawa, one owns a Wartburg, the others own more upmarket models such as an Opel Rekord or the Alfa Romeo owned by the unhappily married couple. Supposedly taking speed (although it is later revealed the pills are a placebo), and carousing in the cattle truck of a freight train, the group offers various satirical sidelights on Polish society of the 1960s. The characters also reflect that the truck may have been one of those in which the former generation were transported during World War II to the Nazi death camps.

The final credits show the actors as they are in 1981, with the exception of Bogumił Kobiela, who died in 1969.

The film was screened out of competition at the 1981 Cannes Film Festival.

Cast
 Jerzy Skolimowski as Andrzej Leszczyc (Zastava)
 Joanna Szczerbic as Alfa
 Tadeusz Łomnicki as Opel Rekord
 Adam Hanuszkiewicz as Romeo
 Bogumil Kobiela as Wartburg

External links

References

1981 drama films
1981 films
Films directed by Jerzy Skolimowski
Films with screenplays by Jerzy Skolimowski
Polish drama films
Polish-language films